Martin Borre (born 27 March 1979) is a Danish former professional footballer who played as a midfielder.

External links
Danish national team profile
Career statistics

1979 births
Living people
Danish men's footballers
Denmark under-21 international footballers
Brøndby IF players
Køge Boldklub players
Odense Boldklub players
IK Start players
Vejle Boldklub players
Danish Superliga players
Eliteserien players
Expatriate footballers in Norway
Danish expatriate men's footballers
Danish expatriate sportspeople in Norway
Association football midfielders